Pangeran Adipati Soejono (Tulungagung, Dutch East Indies, March 31, 1886 – London, United Kingdom, January 5, 1943) was a Dutch politician and the only Indonesian minister who has ever taken part in a meeting of the Dutch cabinet, and was the first Muslim to serve in a ministerial capacity in the Netherlands.

Career
Scion of a Javanese regent family, he was the son of a “wedono,” or district head, and himself held the title of regent in Pasururan from 1942 to 1943. From 1939 to 1941 he served as chairman of the Board of Trustees of the Executive Academy in Batavia. He was a member of the People's Council (Volksraad) and sat on the Council of the Dutch East Indies (Raad van Nederlandsch-Indië) from 29 February 1940 to 1941. Beginning in October 1940 he belonged to the committee for the revision of the Dutch East Indies electoral system, known as the Wisman committee.

Just before the fall of the Dutch East Indies, he escaped, along with Hubertus van Mook, to Australia. Van Mook was appointed Minister of Colonies in the war cabinet in London and Soejono was his top adviser, holding the title of Vice-Chairman of the Council of Assistance for the Dutch East Indies, from 21 May 1942 to 8 June 1942. Soejono was appointed on June 6, 1942, as minister without portfolio, a title he held until his death. His intended role was to explain to the Americans that the Dutch colonial policy was not reactionary.

He was active in the NIVB (Nederlandsch-Indische Vrijzinnige Bond, or Dutch-Indian Liberal Union).

Self-determination issue for Indonesia
Soejono advised Queen Wilhelmina on the constitutional relationship between the Netherlands and Indonesia after the Second World War. In October 1942, he wrote two notes in which he explained that many Indonesians did not want to return to their colonial status after the war and argued that the Netherlands should respect Indonesian self-determination. During a cabinet meeting in October 1942, Soejono passionately appealed to his colleagues to support his view, but without success, not even the Ministers of the Dutch Labour party (SDAP).

In the speech of Queen Wilhelmina of December 7, 1942 no self-determination was offered to the Indonesian people. Only more participation would come after the war.

"I imagine, without prejudice to the government conference's advice, that they will focus on a National Association, which the Netherlands, Indonesia, Suriname and Curaçao will have participated together, while each in itself, its own autonomy in internal affairs and drawing on their own, but together with the will to assist, will represent. It will be difference of treatment based on race or national character have no place, but will only have the personal ability of citizens and the needs of different populations for the decisive policy of the Government."

Death
On January 5, 1943, Raden Adhipatti Ario Soejono died at the age of 56. Sailors belonging to the Royal Netherlands Navy attended his funeral in London.

Personal life

He was married to the daughter of the Pasuroean regent. His son Irawan Soejono, who served in the Dutch resistance was shot by German troops in 1945, and was remembered in the Jakarta Post in 2015 as the “most legendary figure” of the Perhimpunan Indonesia (PI), the Indonesian student association in the Netherlands. A memorial to the younger Soejono, whose nom de guerre was “Henk,” was unveiled in June 2015 at the Groenesteeg Park in Leiden, and a street in Amsterdam, Irawan Soejonostraat, is named in his memory.

See also
List of Dutch politicians

References

1886 births
1943 deaths
Dutch people of Indonesian descent
Dutch people of Javanese descent
Ministers without portfolio of the Netherlands
People from Tulungagung Regency
Priyayi